The Settlers is a novel by Vilhelm Moberg from 1956. It is the third and the longest part of the series The Emigrants.

Plot 
The book tells about the group's new life in America where most of them now have started to feel at home. It also follows Robert and Arvid's journey on the California Trail.

Film, television or theatrical adaptions
The New Land, a 1972 sequel to the first film, based on the last two novels.

References

1956 novels
Novels by Vilhelm Moberg
Historical novels
Albert Bonniers Förlag books
Swedish-language novels
Novels about immigration to the United States
Works about Swedish-American culture